There are twelve manga adaptations of Sword Art Online, all written by Reki Kawahara and published by ASCII Media Works. , illustrated by Tamako Nakamura, was serialized in Dengeki Bunko Magazine between the September 2010 and May 2012 issues. Two tankōbon volumes of Aincrad were released on September 27, 2012. A comedy four-panel manga, titled  and illustrated by Jūsei Minami, began serialization in the September 2010 issue of Dengeki Bunko Magazine. The first volume of Sword Art Online. was released on September 27, 2012. A third manga, titled  and illustrated by Hazuki Tsubasa, began serialization in the May 2012 issue of Dengeki Bunko Magazine. The first volume of Fairy Dance was released on October 27, 2012; the third volume was released on June 27, 2014. The Aincrad and Fairy Dance manga have been acquired for release in North America by Yen Press. The first volume of Aincrad was published on March 25, 2014.

A spin-off manga starring Lisbeth, Silica, and Leafa, titled  and illustrated by Neko Nekobyō, began serialization in the July 2013 issue of Dengeki Bunko Magazine. Girls Ops was licensed by Yen Press in November 2014, the first volume of which was released on May 19, 2015. A manga adaption of Sword Art Online: Progressive, illustrated by Kiseki Himura, began serialization in the August 2013 issue of Dengeki G's Magazine. The manga ended serialization in the magazine's May 2014 issue and was transferred to Dengeki G's Comic starting with the June 2014 issue. The original series ended with the seventh volume, and a new one started, subtitled Progressive: Barcarole of Froth. The Progressive manga adaption has been licensed by Yen Press, with the first two volumes released in January and April 2015, respectively.

A sixth manga, titled Sword Art Online: Phantom Bullet and illustrated by Kōtarō Yamada, had its first chapter serialized in the May 2014 issue of Dengeki Bunko Magazine, with following chapters being digitally serialized on Kadokawa's Comic Walker website. A seventh manga, titled Sword Art Online: Calibur and illustrated by Shii Kiya, was serialized in Dengeki G's Comic between the September 2014 and July 2015 issues. A single compilation volume was released on August 10, 2015. An eighth manga, titled Sword Art Online: Mother's Rosario and also by Hazuki Tsubasa, is based on the seventh volume of the novel series and began serialization in the July 2014 issue of Dengeki Bunko Magazine. A ninth manga, titled Sword Art Online Alternative Gun Gale Online, began serialization in the November 2015 issue of Dengeki Maoh.

A tenth manga, titled Sword Art Online: Project Alicization and illustrated by Kōtarō Yamada, based on the Alicization arc of the light novel series, began serialization in the September 2016 issue of Dengeki Bunko Magazine.

Volume list

Sword Art Online: Aincrad

Sword Art Online: Fairy Dance

Sword Art Online: Phantom Bullet

Sword Art Online: Calibur

Sword Art Online: Mother's Rosario

Sword Art Online: Ordinal Scale

Sword Art Online: Project Alicization

Sword Art Online: Girls Ops

Sword Art Online: Progressive

Sword Art Online Alternative Gun Gale Online

Sword Art Online: Kirito's Thousand and One Night Story

Sword Art Online: Hollow Realization

Sword Art Online: Alicization Lycoris

Sword Art Online: Kiss and Fly

Sword Art Online: Re:Aincrad

Sword Art Online 4-koma

Sword Art Online 4-koma Official Anthology

Sword Art Online: Comic Anthology

Sword Art Online: Dengeki Comic Anthology

Sword Art Online: Official Comic Anthology

Sword Art Online: Memory Defrag Comic Anthology

References

Sword Art Online
Sword Art Online
Seinen manga